Mir Asadollah Madani Dehkharghani (1914 – 11 September 1981) was an Iranian politician and Shia cleric. He was the second Imam Jumu'ah of Tabriz, the Imam Jumu'ah of Hamadan, the representative of the Supreme Leader in East Azerbaijan for less than a year, and a member of the Muslim People's Republic Party. Madani was also Hamadan Province's representative in the first term of the Assembly of Experts. 

He was assassinated on 11 September 1981. According to Tehran radio, he was killed by a guerrilla with a grenade. Iranian government press sometimes refers to him as "the second martyr of Mihrab."

Political activity 
In 1970, Mir Asadollah Madani returned to Iran in opposition to the rule of Mohammad Reza Pahlavi. However, his actions resulted in him being exiled to Bandar Kangan.  He was later arrested by SAVAK and was deported several times in the 1960s. He used SAVAK to escape the pressures of the religious spectrum in 1972, banishing him to the Valley Moradbeik around Hamedan. After the 1979 Iranian Revolution, he was appointed as the Imam of Tabriz.

Assassination
On 11 September 1981, at the end of the Friday prayer, Madani was approached by an unknown man. The man then detonated a grenade that was hidden under his clothes, which led to the death of Mir Asadollah Madani and three others, as well as leaving 50 people injured. Madani was killed in a mihrab and hence acquired the title "the second martyr of Mihrab," the first one being Ali ibn Abi Talib who was also assassinated while praying.

Commemorations
 Azarbaijan Shahid Madani University, a public university in his hometown
 Shahid Madani Metro Station, a station on the Tehran Metro Line 2
 Shahid Madani of Tabriz International Airport
 Operation Shahid Madani, an operation launched by the Islamic Republic of Iran Army in the Iran–Iraq War (1982)
 Shahid Madani Dam in Tabriz
 Shahid Madani Heart Hospital in Tabriz
Shahid Madani Hospital in Khorramabad

References

 People from Azarshahr
 Assassinated Iranian politicians
1914 births
1981 deaths
Iranian Shia scholars of Islam
 Representatives of the Supreme Leader in the Provinces of Iran
 Members of the Assembly of Experts
People assassinated by the People's Mojahedin Organization of Iran
Deaths by hand grenade